The Hardest Heart is In Strict Confidence's ninth studio album.
Released only a month after it was originally announced October 19, 2016. It was released as a CD, Limited Double CD and Limited Edition box which also contained Face the Fear on cassette.

Regarding the long wait between albums, front-man Dennis Ostermann told Side-Line magazine:

Artwork
The artwork was created by Stefan Heilemann who previously collaborated with In Strict Confidence with his award-winning 2011 art book "Laugh, cry and scream", which had an accompanying CD of their music. He has also created artwork for bands such as Lindemann, Kamelot, Nightwish and Megaherz.

Critical reception
The album reached number 2 album in the Deutsche Alternative Charts in early 2017 and the song Herz reached number 9 as a single.

Track listing

Singles and EPs
 Somebody Else's Dream
 Everything Must Change
 Herz & Frozen Kisses

References

2016 albums
In Strict Confidence albums